La Chapelle-Neuve is a commune in the Côtes-d'Armor department of Brittany in northwestern France.

Population

Inhabitants of La Chapelle-Neuve are called Chapelle-neuvois in French.

Breton language
In 2007, 100% of primary school children attended bilingual schools.

See also
Communes of the Côtes-d'Armor department

References

External links

Communes of Côtes-d'Armor